Shantou Waisha Airport is a military air base in the city of Shantou in Guangdong province, China. It was formerly the main public airport serving the Shantou until Jieyang Chaoshan Airport was opened on 15 December 2011 and all civilian flights were transferred to the new airport.

Shantou Waisha Airport is located in Longhu District and opened in 1956 as a military airport for People's Liberation Army Air Force. It opened for commercial air carriers on 15 April 1974.

See also
List of airports in China
List of People's Liberation Army Air Force airbases

References

Airports in Guangdong
Defunct airports in China
Shantou
Chinese Air Force bases
Airports established in 1956
Airports established in 1974
Airports disestablished in 2011
1956 establishments in China
1974 establishments in China